is a train station on the  Osaka Metro Chūō Line in Minato-ku, Osaka, Japan. It is the stop that services the Osaka Municipal Central Gymnasium and Osaka city pool.

Station layout
There are two side platforms with a track each on the third floor.

References

Railway stations in Osaka Prefecture
Railway stations in Japan opened in 1961
Osaka Metro stations